Ainaži Parish is an administrative unit of Limbaži Municipality in the Vidzeme region of Latvia. It was created in 2010 from the countryside territory of Ainaži town. At the beginning of 2014, the population of the parish was 527.  t the beginning of 2019, the population of the parish was 663.

Towns, villages and settlements of Ainaži parish 
 Lampuži
 Mailīšciems
 Mērnieki

References 

Parishes of Latvia
Limbaži Municipality
Vidzeme